Live at Cobi's is a live album by saxophonist Bill Barron which was recorded in 1987 and 1988 and released posthumously on the SteepleChase label in 2005.

Reception 
In JazzTimes Chris Kelsey wrote "Straightahead tenor players who regularly stretch themselves and break a sweat in the process are too few and far between these days. That’s what makes a record by someone like the late Bill Barron so attractive. Barron had no such problems cutting loose. He possessed an original voice-not revolutionary, but unique in its way".

Track listing 
All compositions by Bill Barron except where noted.
 "This One's for Monk" – 13:07
 "Easy Does It" – 12:18
 "Confirmation" (Charlie Parker) – 10:56
 "Row House"  (Kenny Barron) – 9:47
 "Angel Eyes" (Matt Dennis, Earl Brent) – 5:55
 "Voyage" (Kenny Barron) – 8:45
 "Until Further Notice" – 9:23

Personnel 
Bill Barron – tenor saxophone
Fred Simmons – piano
Santi Debriano – bass
Ben Riley – drums

References 

2005 live albums
SteepleChase Records live albums
Bill Barron (musician) live albums